Six ships of the Royal Navy have been named HMS Amethyst, whilst another was planned:

  was a 36-gun fifth-rate frigate, originally the French frigate Perle, launched in 1790, captured in 1793, and wrecked off Alderney in 1795.
  was a  36-gun fifth rate launched in 1799 and wrecked in 1811.
  was a  26-gun sixth rate launched in 1844 and sold in 1869 for use as a cable vessel.
  was an  screw corvette launched in 1873 and sold in 1887.
  was a  cruiser launched in 1903 and scrapped in 1920.
  was a modified Black Swan-class sloop launched in 1943. She was later designated as a frigate, was involved in the Yangtze Incident in 1949 and was broken up in 1957.
She was renamed  before being launched in 1983, and was sold to the Bangladeshi Navy in 1994, being renamed Shapla.

Battle honours
Ships named Amethyst have earned the following battle honours:
Cerbere, 1800
Thetis, 1808
Niemen, 1809
China, 1856−60
Ashantee, 1873−74
Heligoland, 1914
Dardanelles, 1915
Atlantic, 1945
Korea, 1951−52

See also
  was an anti-submarine trawler requisitioned in 1935 and sunk by a mine on 24 November 1940.

References
 
 Hepper, David J. (1994) British Warship Losses in the Age of Sail, 1650-1859. (Rotherfield: Jean Boudriot). 
 

Royal Navy ship names